Omar Naim (born 27 September 1977) is a Lebanese film director and screenwriter best known for writing and directing the 2004 film The Final Cut.

Life and career

Early life and education 
Omar Naim was born in Jordan to a Lebanese journalist father and the renowned Lebanese actress and playwright mother Nidal Al-Ashkar. Growing up surrounded by artists, musicians and writers, Naim had a childhood enriched with art and culture. His parents were both in theater and film. His mother, Nidal Al-Ashkar, the matriarch of Lebanese theater, is the founder of Masrah Al-Madina (The City Theater) where she was decorated by the French government in 1997 with a Knight Grade Decoration of Arts and Letters.

Naim had his first film-going experience at 14. As he grew more and more fascinated with the world of cinema, he became furthermore interested in nurturing the abilities of writing and visuals. As an aspiring filmmaker, Naim was mostly inspired by directors like Martin Scorsese, Woody Allen, Oliver Stone and Spike Lee.

With the help of the Fares Foundation, Naim went on to study film at Emerson College in Boston, Massachusetts. During his four-year education at Emerson, Naim created a number of short films, among which figures his 1999 thesis, a 28-minute documentary titled Grand Theater: A Tale of Beirut. In this work, Naim puts the spotlight on Beirut’s historic Grand Theater, which was torn in a violent no-man's land between two bellicose sides in the Lebanese civil war. The theater serves as a metaphorical illustration for Lebanon's tragic 15-year civil war. Through the eyes of the old theater, the different tales of actors, directors, soldiers and civilians are woven together at the Grand Theater. As war escalates in scale and absurdity, the lines between war and theater, as well as between show and reality, become blurred. The film earned Naim several awards at Emerson, an Honorable Mention, and played at a number of international festivals. Naim was also a finalist for the Student Oscar given by the AMPAS in 2000. Above all, and perhaps most importantly, this film earned the young director loaded hands-on experience he needed to be able to tackle his next giant project, which was still dormant at that time. “I learned everything making that film, from inception to print”, says Naim.

Career 

In 2004, Naim wrote and directed his first feature film, The Final Cut, which starred Academy Award winning actor and comedian Robin Williams, Academy Award winning actress Mira Sorvino, and Jim Caviezel. Tak Fujimoto, of The Silence of the Lambs and The Sixth Sense fame, oversaw the cinematography. The film won the best screenplay award at the Deauville Film Festival and was an official selection of the Berlin Film Festival.

“The Final Cut is about editing and memory” said the young director barely 27 at the time. Naim also stated that his Lebanese origins also influenced the film's plot. “It’s the Lebanese notion of mass memory, and people's very subjective memory and view of the world,” he explains. “This subsequently dictates how society functions. I extrapolated that into sci-fi theory”. 
 
Naim had sent his script to the French project Equinox, where hundreds of screenwriters from around the world submit their movie scripts. Only ten are chosen and are flown into Bordeaux to work on their screenplay with a group of experts for a week. Naim was one of the lucky ten and was then fixed with an agent. Upon his arrival, Naim made it clear that he was not interested in having anyone but himself direct his movie. Naim indeed was allotted the post of director and, once headed to the U.S., Lionsgate Entertainment gave the script a green light. 
 
As Lionsgate was recruiting actors, Robin Williams expressed interest in playing the lead role of Alan Hakman. Having loved the script, Williams told Naim that what really “struck” him was the “sense of mortality, something [he] hadn't explored as an actor before”. Within weeks, the rest of the cast and crew was hired. The 95 minutes movie was shot on 35mm film in Vancouver, British Columbia, Canada and was described by Naim as a very harmonious, very organized 35-day shoot “with no problems whatsoever”.

Recognition 

Won
 Deauville Film Festival, 2004: Best Screenplay for The Final Cut
 New England Film and Video Festival, 2000: Honorable Mention for Grand Theater: A Tale of Beirut

Nominations
 Berlin International Film Festival, 2004: Golden Berlin Bear for The Final Cut
 Deauville Film Festival, 2004: Grand Special Prize for The Final Cut
 Sitges - Catalan International Film Festival, 2004: Best Film for The Final Cut

Filmography 
Director
 The Empty Quarter (2021 film), Writer and Director
 Two Cities (Madinataan), (2021 film)
 Becoming (2020 film) Writer and Director
Dead Awake (2010)
Stand Up: Muslim-American Comics Come of Age (2009) (co-director)
The Final Cut (2004) (as Omar Naïm)

Grand Theater: A Tale of Beirut (1999)
When Simon Sleeps (1999)
Writer
 The Final Cut (2004) (written by) (as Omar Naïm)
Producer
 Grand Theater: A Tale of Beirut (1999) (producer)

Editor
 Grand Theater: A Tale of Beirut (1999)
 When Simon Sleeps (1999)

References

External links

 ADC Conversation With Up and Coming Arab-American Director Omar Naim
 Article about Omar Naim and The Final Cut Special to The Daily Star
 The Passion of the Christ star Jim Caviezel and director Omar Naim puzzle out how we'll be remembered in The Final Cut

1977 births
Living people
People from Amman
Lebanese film directors
American film directors